The 2002 Volvo PGA Championship was the 48th edition of the Volvo PGA Championship, an annual professional golf tournament on the European Tour. It was held 23–26 May at the West Course of Wentworth Club in Virginia Water, Surrey, England, a suburb southwest of London.

Anders Hansen won by five strokes over Colin Montgomerie and Eduardo Romero to claim his first Volvo PGA Championship.

Course layout

Past champions in the field 
Nine former champions entered the tournament.

Made the cut

Missed the cut

Nationalities in the field

Round summaries

First round 
Thursday, 23 May 2002

Second round 
Friday, 24 May 2002

Third round 
Saturday, 25 May 2002

Final round 
Sunday, 26 May 2002

Scorecard

Cumulative tournament scores, relative to par

Source:

References 

BMW PGA Championship
Golf tournaments in England
Volvo PGA Championship
Volvo PGA Championship
Volvo PGA Championship